Athanasios Augustus Scheidt (born 24 March 1998) is an American soccer player of Greek descent who plays as a midfielder for Cypriot club Ayia Napa.

Club career

Early career
Scheidt is a product of the youth team systems of various American and German sides. He was also part of the teams as San Martín (SJ), and Leixões, but mainly played for their reserve teams and failed to debut in the first teams.

Radomiak Radom
On 9 October 2020, Scheidt signed a one-year contract with I liga club Radomiak Radom. On 6 November 2020, he made his debut in a 0–1 away win against Stomil Olsztyn after being named in the starting line-up.

Personal life
Scheidt was born in New Jersey, United States, to Greek parents. Scheidt's father, John as well as sister, Joan, were both soccer players.

Raised in Wall Township, New Jersey, Scheidt played prep soccer at Christian Brothers Academy.

References

External links

1998 births
Living people
Christian Brothers Academy (New Jersey) alumni
People from Wall Township, New Jersey
Sportspeople from Monmouth County, New Jersey
Soccer players from New Jersey
Association football midfielders
American soccer players
American expatriate soccer players in Germany
American expatriate sportspeople in Argentina
American expatriate sportspeople in Portugal
American expatriate sportspeople in Poland
American expatriate sportspeople in Cyprus
Greek footballers
Greek expatriate footballers
Greek expatriate sportspeople in the United States
Greek expatriate sportspeople in Germany
Greek expatriate sportspeople in Portugal
Greek expatriate sportspeople in Poland
Greek expatriate sportspeople in Cyprus
Expatriate footballers in Poland
I liga players
Radomiak Radom players
Ayia Napa FC players